The Canadian Champion Sprint Horse was a  Canadian Thoroughbred horse racing honour that was part of the Sovereign Awards program awarded annually to the top Thoroughbred of either sex competing in sprint races in Canada. Created in 1980 by the Jockey Club of Canada as a single award, in 2009 it was split to become a separate award for the Canadian Champion Male Sprint Horse and for the Canadian Champion Female Sprint Horse.

Winners

1980 : La Voyageuse
1981 : Eternal Search
1982 : Avowal
1983 : Fraud Squad
1984 : Diapason
1985 : Summer Mood
1986 : New Connection
1987 : Play the King
1988 : Play the King
1989 : Mr. Hot Shot
1990 : Twist the Snow
1991 : King Corrie
1992 : King Corrie
1993 : Apeilia
1994 : King Ruckus
1995 : Scotzanna
1996 : Langfuhr
1997 : Glanmire
1998 : Deputy Inxs
1999 : Deputy Inxs
2000 : One Way Love
2001 : Mr. Epperson
2002 : Wake at Noon
2003 : Soaring Free
2004 : Blonde Executive
2005 : Judiths Wild Rush
2006 : Judiths Wild Rush 
2007 : Financingavailable
2008 : Fatal Bullet

References
 The Sovereign Awards at the Jockey Club of Canada

Sovereign Award winners
Horse racing awards
Horse racing in Canada